P. Felix Ganz (January 23, 1922 – September 5, 1990), of Chicago, Illinois, was a student and collector of postage stamps and postal history as well as an officer of several major philatelic organizations.

Collecting interests
Ganz was especially noted for his collections of postal history, postal stationery, and postage stamps of Switzerland, Liechtenstein and Andorra. When he exhibited his “Pre-Confederation Switzerland 1748-1848” at philatelic exhibitions in 1979, it was awarded the APS Champion of Champions classification.  Ganz was also interested in other segments of philately, such as philately of U.S. postal stationery, France, Monaco, and Canada.

Philatelic activity
Ganz served as president of a number of philatelic organizations, including the American Helvetia Philatelic Society, the Chicago Philatelic Society, and the United Postal Stationery Society.

Philatelic literature
As well as serving as the editor of the journal Tell, Ganz authored numerous philatelic articles. A collection of his articles in Tell were later printed by the American Helvetia Philatelic Society in book form as Postal Cancellations and Markings in Switzerland. In addition Ganz for many years wrote a column called Brief aus Chicago in the Berner Briefmarken Zeitung. He also co-authored the book Perfins of Switzerland.

 Ganz also served on the philatelic exhibition AMERIPEX in 1986 as commissioner coordinator.

Honors and awards
The Chicago Philatelic Society acknowledged Ganz’ philatelic efforts by awarding him the Newbery Medal. He was also elected to the APS Writers Unit Hall of Fame in 1988, and, in 1992, he was named to the American Philatelic Society Hall of Fame.

See also
 Postage stamps and postal history of Switzerland
 Philatelic literature

External links
 APS Hall of Fame - Dr. P. Felix Ganz

1922 births
1990 deaths
Philatelic literature
American philatelists
People from Chicago
American Philatelic Society